The Troy Transit Center is an unstaffed train station in Troy, Michigan, United States, that is served by Amtrak's Wolverine, which runs thrice daily between Chicago, Illinois, and Pontiac, Michigan (via Kalamazoo, Ann Arbor, and Detroit, Michigan). It is also served by Suburban Mobility Authority for Regional Transportation (SMART). The transit center replaced the nearby Birmingham Amtrak station in October 2014.

Description

The transit center is located in the southwest corner of Troy at 1201 Doyle Drive. The Oakland/Troy Airport is located just a few blocks away, on the east side of Coolidge Highway. The transit center has fairly easy access from both I-75 and Woodward Avenue (M-1).

The Troy Transit Center brings together the services of Amtrak, SMART buses and taxis. Designed by local architectural firm Neumann/Smith, the one story,  brick building includes a waiting room and restrooms, as well as large expanses of glass that allow natural light to flood the interior. There are 124 spaces for both long and short term free parking. A pedestrian bridge over the tracks allows access to the western platform and protects passengers from inclement weather. There is no ticketing, nor even a Quik-Trak kiosk, and baggage cannot be checked. Station hours are midnight to 2:00 am, 5:00 am to 6:30 am, 10:00 am to 11:30 am, and 5:00 pm to 6:30 pm daily.

There is a bus stand in front of the station and, according to the Troy Chamber of Commerce, there would be an estimated 18,200 SMART passengers stopping adjacent to the new transit center annually (about 50 per day). However, SMART buses were banned from the station in December 2016 as part of a long-running issues with the former owner of the land on which the station sits.  A deal was struck in June 2017 allowing SMART to directly access the station again.
 
Of the 22 Michigan stations regularly served by Amtrak, Troy was the thirteenth-busiest in the Fiscal Year 2015, boarding or detraining an average of approximately 64 passengers daily. Although the Troy Transit Center replaced Birmingham station in early October 2014, the ridership for remained consistent following the change of stations.

History

In 2000 a real estate developer, Grand/Sakwa Properties, LLC, gave the city of Troy title to  land on which to build a new station near the former Birmingham station. However, title to the land was given with the express provision that funding for a transit center be secured within not more than ten years.

In 2011, the cities of Birmingham and Troy were awarded a federal grant to assist in replacing the station with a new, multimodal transit center across the tracks in Troy. However, the city of Birmingham backed out of the project in 2008 and the mayor of Troy, Janice Daniels, rejected the funding on ideological grounds, thus terminating the project. The $6.3 million (equivalent to $ million in ) project was resurrected by a subsequent Troy city administration, with a groundbreaking on November 27, 2012 and final completion in October 2013. However, a legal dispute over title to the land under the transit center kept it from opening for another year. In late September 2014, a settlement by Troy to acquire the land was reached, allowing it to lease the site over the next twenty years to Amtrak. As part of the settlement the City of Troy was ordered to pay $1.05 million (equivalent to $ million in ) to Grand/Sakwa Properties, LLC for the land in dispute. After 14 years of effort, the station finally opened on October 14, 2014, with the nearby Birmingham station having permanently closed the day before. Notwithstanding, the initial settlement to acquire the land, it took nearly another year before a final settlement was reached between the City of Troy and Grand/Sakwa Properties, LLC. The final settlement required an additional payment of $3.1 million (equivalent to $ million in ) to Grand/Sakwa Properties, LLC.

Notes

References

External links

 Troy Amtrak Station (USA Rail Guide - Train Web)
 Official webpage by Troy, Michigan
 Official SMART Website
 
 

Amtrak stations in Michigan
Buildings and structures in Troy, Michigan
Transportation in Oakland County, Michigan
Railway stations in the United States opened in 2014